The Weightlifting at the 1981 Southeast Asian Games was held between 07 December to 09 December at Nichols Air Base Gymnasium, Manila, Philippines.

Medal summary

Medal table

References
 https://eresources.nlb.gov.sg/newspapers/Digitised/Article/straitstimes19811208-1.2.144
 https://eresources.nlb.gov.sg/newspapers/Digitised/Article/straitstimes19811209-1.2.133.6
 https://eresources.nlb.gov.sg/newspapers/Digitised/Article/straitstimes19811210-1.2.115.4

1981 Southeast Asian Games events
Southeast Asian Games
1981